The Committee of Sleep: How Artists, Scientists, and Athletes Use Dreams for Creative Problem-Solving—and How You Can Too is a book by Deirdre Barrett published by Crown/Random House in 2001. Barrett is a psychologist on the faculty of Harvard Medical School.  The book describes how dreams have contributed practical breakthroughs to arts and sciences in the waking world. Chapters are organized by discipline: art, literature, science, sports, medicine, etc. There are long examples of dreams which led to major achievements in each area, but Barrett then draws conclusions about how dreams go about solving problems, what types they are best at, and gives advice on how readers can apply these techniques to their own endeavors.
Those who are described in The Committee of Sleep as having dreamed creations include Ludwig van Beethoven, Billy Joel, Robert Louis Stevenson, Stephen King, Salvador Dalí, William Blake, and Nobel prize winner Otto Loewi.

Contents
Introduction

1. In the Gallery of the Night

2. Dreams That Money Can Buy: Filmmaking and Theater

3. The Stately Pleasure Dome of Dream Literature

4. The Devil Plays the Violin: Dreams and Music

5. The Committee of Sleep Wins a Nobel Prize: Dreams in Science and Math

6. Of Sewing Machines and Other Dreams: Inventions of The Committee

7. The Claw of the Panther: Dreams and the Body

8. When Gandhi Dreamed of Resistance: Variations in Non-western Cultures

9. What Word Starts and Ends With “He”?  Sleep on a Brainteaser and Wake Up with a Headache

Conclusion

Reviews
"This fascinating and balanced compendium is the first critical examination of the tricky subject of the role of dreams and dreaming in creative life -- a question which has been pondered since antiquity. Dr. Barrett draws vividly and eloquently on the world's literature as well as her own clinical experience; one leaves this book with much more respect for sleep and dreaming."
-Oliver Sacks, MD

"For centuries, people have used dream time to inspire success in their waking life. Paul McCartney credits the Beatles hit 'Yesterday' to a dream. Mary Shelley's Frankenstein also came from a dream . . .er, nightmare. In her new book, The Committee of Sleep, Deirdre Barrett advises success-minded sleepers to keep a notepad by the bedside. "Dreaming is a time when unheard parts of ourselves are allowed to speak. We would do well to listen.' Sweet dreams!" 
-USA Today

"Deirdre Barrett collects stories of nocturnal inspiration, including E B White's description of how Stuart Little came to him as he slept, complete with his hat, his cane, and his brisk manner. 'I was deeply touched and felt that I was not free to change him into a grasshopper or a wallaby.'"   -The New Yorker

"Taking her title from John Steinbeck, who once wrote that "a problem difficult at night is resolved in the morning after the committee of sleep has worked on it," Barrett gathers supporting evidence for the idea that dreams can enhance creativity and solve problems, not only for Nobel Prize winners and other overachievers like Coleridge, Gandhi and Dal¡, but for everyone. Drawing on personal narratives, anecdotal evidence and clinical studies, Barrett (The Pregnant Man and Other Cases from a Hypnotherapist's Couch), a faculty member at Harvard Medical School's department of psychiatry, shows how "the Committee" works across all disciplines and media—including poetry, film, engineering, music, sports and politics. She also crosses cultural boundaries to show that dreams in non-Western societies serve a similar creative function. Intriguingly, Barrett explores dreams that foreshadow "illnesses that did not yet show physical symptoms": one man dreamt of a panther piercing him "just to the left of his spine between his shoulder blades," in exactly the spot where, two months, later a malignant melanoma was found. Barrett provides readers with dream exercises and specific techniques for making the most of their sleeping hours. In addressing the "accuracy of dream recall," she reinforces her credibility by acknowledging a greater "potential for distortion when people other than the dreamer repeat the story." However, her use of the catchall term "Committee" begins to lose its irony through repetition, yielding the occasional impression that Barrett actually believes that some independent body governs dream content. But that's one small stylistic quibble with an otherwise graceful and fascinating work."   -Publishers Weekly

References

Popular psychology books
2001 non-fiction books
English-language books